Clifford Davis may refer to:
 L. Clifford Davis, (1927-), Attorney, Judge, integration advocate
 Clifford Davis (politician) (1897–1970), Democratic U.S. Representative from Tennessee
 Clifford Davis (music manager), British musician and music manager
 Clifford Davis (athlete) (1900–1974), South African track and field athlete